Majeed Hayat from the University of New Mexico, Albuquerque, NM was named Fellow of the Institute of Electrical and Electronics Engineers (IEEE) in 2014 for contributions to the modeling of impact ionization and noise in avalanche-photodiode devices.

References

Fellow Members of the IEEE
Living people
Year of birth missing (living people)
Place of birth missing (living people)
University of New Mexico faculty
American electrical engineers